Reino Nordin (born 25 May 1983) is a Finnish actor and musician who is known for starring in films such as Young Gods, Ganes and Purge. Nordin has released three solo albums and also two albums with his band Reino & The Rhinos. His sister is singer Siiri Nordin and his grandmother is Outi Heiskanen.

Partial filmography

Young Gods (2003)
Game Over (2005)
Ganes (2007)
Tears of April (2008)
Purge (2012)
Rendel (2017)
Hatching (2021)

Partial discography

Reino & The Rhinos
Tähän tyyliin (2008)
Kohti huomista (2012)

Solo albums
Bongo Rock (2014)
Antaudun (2017)
Cara Mia (2019)

Singles
"Ylös" (2015)
"Niin varmaan" (featuring Kube) (2015)
"Sol" (2015)
"Puhu vaan" (2016)
"Kato mua silmiin" (2016)
"Otan sut haltuun" (2016)
"Kosketa" (2016)
"Momentumii" (2017)
"Ihmeeni" (2017)
"Ytimeen" (2018)
"Kuinka paljon voi rakastaa" (2018)
"Nyt" (2018)
"Kyynelten virta" (2018)
"Veitsenterällä" (2018)

References

External links

Finnish male film actors
1983 births
Living people
Finnish male musicians
Finnish LGBT singers
Bisexual male actors